Wadebridge East was an electoral division of Cornwall in the United Kingdom which returned one member to sit on Cornwall Council from 2009 to 2021. It was abolished at the 2021 local elections, being succeeded by Wadebridge East and St Minver.

Councillors

Extent
Wadebridge East represented the east of the town of Wadebridge, the villages of St Kew, Chapel Amble, Bodieve, Egloshayle and Sladesbridge, and the hamlets of Trelill, Trequite, Trewethern, St Kew Highway, Trewornan, Kelly and Ball. Although the division was nominally abolished in boundary changes at the 2013 elections, this had little effect on the ward. Before the boundary changes, the division covered 3651 hectares; after, it covered 3,650 hectares.

Election results

2017 election

2013 by-election

2013 election

2009 election

References

Wadebridge
Electoral divisions of Cornwall Council